Libia is an underground station on Line B of the Rome Metro. It is located at the junction of Viale Libia with Via Tigrè and Piazza Palombara Sabina. Originally, the station was supposed to be named Libia-Gondar, referring to the nearby Piazza Gondar.

The station opened on 13 June 2012 as part of the Line B1, an extension of Line B from Bologna to Conca d'Oro.

References

External links

Rome Metro Line B stations
Railway stations opened in 2012
2012 establishments in Italy
Rome Q. XVII Trieste
Railway stations in Italy opened in the 21st century